Ego comme x was the name of a French comics publishing house created in Angoulême in 1994.

Company history 
Ego comme x started by publishing a magazine in 1993 created by a few authors and after a few years started to publish other works.

Creators : Xavier Mussat, Loïc Néhou (director), Fabrice Neaud.

Authors:
Comics : Nine Antico, Aristophane, Matthieu Blanchin, Hugh Somerville, Frédéric Boilet, Jeffrey Brown, Pierre Druilhe, Gabriel Dumoulin, Kazuichi Hanawa, Simon Hureau, Grégory Jarry, Olivier Josso, James Kochalka, Pauline Martin, Pierre Maurel, Lucas Méthé, Xavier Mussat, Freddy Nadolny Poustochkine, Fabrice Neaud, Loïc Néhou, Benoît Peeters, Joe G. Pinelli, Frédéric Poincelet, John Porcellino, Vincent Sardon, Mickaël Sterckeman, Karl Stevens, Jean Teulé, Yoshiharu Tsuge, Vincent Vanoli.

Literature : Virginie Cady, Vincent Ravalec, Fabienne Swiatly, Lionel Tran, Amoreena Winkler.

Ego comme x became famous thanks to the publication of JOURNAL by Fabrice Neaud, which had an important part in the French artistic comics movement of the 1990s. They now have more than 60 books in their catalogue. They are mostly interested in introspection and autobiographies.

They published English-speaking authors for a few years, like Jeffrey Brown, James Kochalka, Karl Stevens and John Porcellino. They also published "the man without quality", the famous book from Japanese author Yoshiharu Tsuge, only available in Japanese and in French.

In 2006, Ego comme x started to publish literature.
In 2011, they started a collection of books printed on demand.
In 2016, unable to secure financing for further operation, Ego comme x closed down.

References 

Comic book publishing companies of France
French companies established in 1994
Mass media in Angoulême